The Right Hand is a Canadian reality TV series that aired on The Movie Network and Movie Central. It follows Brandon MacIntosh, a film school graduate from Ayr, Ontario, hired as production assistant for Porno Dan, the owner of Immoral Productions, an upstart adult entertainment company, operating out of Southern California and attending awards shows in Las Vegas. The second season follows Porno Dan working without Brandon, having quit in the second episode just because Brandon's friend Tyler Shazma was included by Dan in a porn production, yet Brandon claimed the friend didn't appear comfortable even though the friend didn't complain and actually seemed intrigued in his role. Dan even claims that Brandon's departure was "long over due" because "Brandon's words said he wanted to be here, but his actions didn't". Brandon appears in the opening title cards in the rest of the season's episodes. Dan's replacement assistant is Chris, although unknown where Chris came from.

Appearances of notable adult entertainment performers

First season
Brandy Aniston
Aiden Ashley
Sindee Jennings
Shawna Lenee
Molly Rae
Victoria White

Second season
Molly Bennett
Martina "Tarra White" Mrakviova
Rikki Sixx
Britney Amber
Nikki Hunter
Ashli Orion
Siri

References

External links
 
 The Right Hand at telebisyon.net

2011 Canadian television series debuts
2010s Canadian reality television series
2012 Canadian television series endings